The 1940 New England hurricane moved off of the U.S. East Coast and Atlantic Canada in August and September 1940, producing strong winds and torrential rainfall. The fourth tropical cyclone and third hurricane of the season, the storm originated from a well-defined low-pressure area in the open Atlantic Ocean on August 26. Moving slowly in a general west-northwest motion, the disturbance intensified, reaching tropical storm strength on August 28 and subsequently hurricane intensity on August 30. The hurricane passed within  of Cape Hatteras before recurving towards the northeast. Afterwards, the hurricane began a weakening trend as it proceeded northeastward, and had degenerated into a tropical storm by the time it made its first landfall on Nova Scotia later that day. The storm transitioned into an extratropical cyclone the next day while making another landfall on New Brunswick. The extratropical remnants persisted into Quebec before merging with a larger extratropical system late on September 3.

Despite not making landfall on the United States, the hurricane caused widespread damage. Extensive precautionary measures were undertaken across the coast, particularly in New England. The heightened precautions were due in part to fears that effects from the storm would be similar to that of a devastating hurricane that struck the region two years prior. This would make the storm the wettest in state history. The resultant floods damaged infrastructure, mostly to road networks. Damage in the state amounted to $4 million. Farther north in New England, strong winds were reported, though damage remained minimal. Although the storm made two landfalls in Atlantic Canada, damage there too was minimal, and was limited to several boating incidents caused by strong waves. Overall, the hurricane caused seven fatalities.

Meteorological history

The origins of the hurricane can be traced to a compact and slow-moving low-pressure area in the open Atlantic Ocean in late August 1940. As the system progressed in a west-northwest direction, its center of circulation became more organized. As a result, the disturbance was classified as a tropical depression between the Greater Antilles and Bermuda at 1200 UTC on August 26. Operationally, the storm was analyzed to have undergone tropical cyclogenesis on August 30. However, a reanalysis of the storm conducted in 2012 found that the system was already organized prior. In its initial stages, the depression remained weak, with few ships reporting abnormally strong winds in association with the storm. Continuing in a slow west-northwest movement, the disturbance gradually intensified, and was analyzed to have attained tropical storm intensity by 1800 UTC on August 28. At the same time, the hurricane began to intensify and move quicker than it had previously.

At 1200 UTC on September 1, the hurricane attained modern-day Category 2 intensity. Ships continued to report strong winds and low pressures associated with the storm. Early on September 1, the hurricane passed  of Cape Hatteras, North Carolina, before recurving towards the northeast and away from the coast. That same day, two ships reported hurricane-force winds. At 0200 UTC on September 2, the American steamboat Franklin K. Lane reported a barometric pressure of  while located within the hurricane's radius of maximum wind; this would be the lowest pressure measured in association with the tropical cyclone and the lowest measured in the entire North Atlantic Ocean in September 1940. As it traversed though more northerly latitudes, the storm began to gradually weaken. After quickly passing over Nova Scotia, the weakening tropical storm transitioned into an extratropical storm over the Bay of Fundy at 0000 UTC on September 3. The extratropical system progressed over the Gulf of Saint Lawrence before it was absorbed by a larger extratropical storm at 1800 UTC later that day in Quebec just north of Anticosti Island.

Preparations, impact, and aftermath

As the hurricane approached the United States East Coast on August 31, the United States Weather Bureau advised extreme caution to ships between Cape Hatteras and southern areas of New England. Storm warnings were issued for coastal regions between Wilmington, North Carolina and the Virginia Capes. These warnings were later extended northward to the Delaware Breakwater. Strong winds exceeding gale-force were expected for much of the East Coast, particularly for Cape Hatteras. On September 1, hurricane warnings were ordered for areas from Hatteras, North Carolina to Pamlico Sound, while previously issued storm warnings remained in place. On September 2, gale warnings extended further north into Nantucket, Massachusetts. In Norfolk, Virginia, city department heads were ordered to stand by for potential emergency duties. United States Coast Guard personnel were also dispatched along the North Carolina coast. United States Navy personnel were detained in New London, Connecticut until the storm passed. In Westhampton, New York, a mass evacuation occurred, involving 10,000 residences. Air traffic to and from Mitchel Air Force Base was cancelled, and 100 airplanes stationed at the base were fastened to the ground. Police and firemen evacuated a  stretch of the Rhode Island coastline. This included Roy Carpenter's Beach, where 1,000 families were forced to evacuate. In Narragansett Bay, boats were sent back to harbors or towed to shore. The extensive precautionary measures undertaken occurred in part due to fears that the storm would cause similar effects to a destructive hurricane which swept through areas of New England two years prior.

United States Coast Guard stations in Norfolk, Virginia and Morehead City, North Carolina dispatched cutters to aid the ship. Off of the East Coast, an offshoot of the hurricane resulted in the drownings of two people. In the Mid-Atlantic states, the passing hurricane's outflow interacted with a cold front that had become quasi-stationary over the area. This would make the hurricane the wettest tropical cyclone in state history. Most of the rain was in western portions of the state, however, with minimal rainfall at the coast. The floods caused small rivers to overflow, breaching dams. An overflowed creek inundated parts of Lumberton Township, rendering 2,000 people homeless. Rail service between Philadelphia, Pennsylvania and areas of southern New Jersey was suspended as a result of washed out tracks. Resulting damage to infrastructure totaled $4,000,000 in the southwestern quarter of New Jersey alone. Damage to roads in Burlington County amounted to $2,500,000. In Camden County, damage was estimated at $1 million. Four fatalities were reported as a result of the floods. In Delaware, rainfall was comparatively less. However, rough seas generated by the hurricane offshore caused $50,000 in damages and one death. Further north, strong gusts were reported across New England.

After the storm, New Jersey state health department investigators from Trenton were dispatched to study the possibility for an increase in typhoid fever in flooded areas. In Woodbury, where the city pumping station was flooded, water was rationed. Gas service was also limited in Woodbury, Pedricktown, Penns Grove. As a result of a gas plant becoming inundated in Glassboro, electricity was rationalized in Hammonton, forcing residents to eat uncooked food. Police were forced to transport residents of Mount Holly to work via boat due to the high floodwaters.

Despite making two separate landfalls in Atlantic Canada on September 2 and September 3, the hurricane caused minimal damage. Effects in Nova Scotia were limited to boating incidents. In Lake Milo, near Yarmouth, six yachts capsized due to the strong winds. In New Brunswick, damage was also minimal. A car accident associated with the storm injured a man near Barnesville.

See also

List of Canada hurricanes
1940 Nova Scotia hurricane
Hurricane Daisy (1962)

Notes

References

New England hurricane
New England hurricane
New England hurricane
New England
Category 2 Atlantic hurricanes
Hurricanes in Canada
Hurricanes in New England
New England hurricane
New England hurricane